103.7 Hope Radio (DXBH 103.7 MHz) is an FM station owned and operated by Adventist Media. Its studios and transmitter are located at Tangub.

References

External links
Hope Radio Western Mindanao FB Page
Hope Radio Western Mindanao Website

Radio stations in Misamis Occidental
Radio stations established in 2016
Christian radio stations in the Philippines